Sheffield Wednesday Football Club is an English football club based in Sheffield, South Yorkshire. The club was founded in 1867 and has competed in the English football league system since 1892. They have taken part in UEFA-sanctioned cup competition on four occasions.

History

1961–62 Inter-Cities Fairs Cup
As league runners-up in the 1960–61 season, Wednesday were invited to compete for the Inter-Cities Fairs Cup the following season. They knocked out Lyon and Roma before succumbing to Barcelona in the quarter-finals. Had they won, they would have faced Red Star Belgrade in the semi-finals.

First Round

Wednesday won 7–6 on aggregate.

Second Round

Wednesday won 4–1 on aggregate.

Quarter-Finals

Barcelona won 4–3 on aggregate.

1963–64 Inter-Cities Fairs Cup
Two years after their inaugural European campaign, Wednesday were again invited to compete in the Inter-Cities Fairs Cup, after a sixth place league finish. They overcame Dutch part-timers DOS Utrecht in the first round before losing out to Cologne in the next.

First Round

Wednesday won 8–2 on aggregate.

Second Round

Cologne won 5–3 on aggregate.

1992–93 UEFA Cup
Wednesday qualified for the 1992-93 UEFA Cup following a 3rd-place finish in the 1991-92 First Division. They comfortably progressed against Luxembourg minnows Spora before bowing out to Kaiserslautern in a feisty two-legged Second Round affair.

First Round

Wednesday won 10–2 on aggregate.

Second Round

Kaiserslautern won 5–3 on aggregate.

1995–96 Intertoto Cup

Wednesday were invited to compete in the inaugural Intertoto Cup in 1995, and placed in Group 1. The Owls' first match against FC Basel took place while most of the players were still on holiday, so guest players had to pull on the blue and white shirt - one was John Pearson, who had last appeared for the club 10 years earlier. Wednesday finished second in the five team group, which was not enough to take them into the next round of the competition.

Group 1

Both home matches were played at Rotherham United's Millmoor as Hillsborough was unavailable.

Summary

Playing record

References

Europe
Sheffield Wednesday